Valhalla is a 2013 American/Canadian skiing and snowboarding adventure film directed by Ben Sturgulewski and Nick Waggoner of Sweetgrass Productions. It stars Cody Barnhill and Austin Ross; Kasey Ryne Mazak is the narrator.

Plot 
Conrad is driving north in a state of personal crisis when his Volkswagen breaks down and he discovers a hippie ski camp called Valhalla. There he rediscovers the pleasures of playing in the snow.

Cast 

 Cody Barnhill as Conrad
 Austin Ross as Skier
 Sierra Quitiquit
 Kasey Ryne Mazak as Japanese Narrator
 Billynaire Cruz as Bar Patron

Production 
Valhalla was filmed over two years in Nelson, British Columbia, to combine artistically filmed extreme skiing and snowboarding with the plot. Instead of using helicopters, production involved hiking up to the shooting locations and overnight camping; many local skiers and snowboarders appear, and there is a naked skiing and snowboarding scene. The final scene, in a rainforest, was shot at Mount Baker in Washington state, with snow trucked in.

The film premiered at the Paramount Theatre in Denver, Colorado, on September 13, 2013.

References

External links 
 

2010s English-language films